Hong Kong Affairs Advisers were appointed by the Chinese government after the last Governor of Hong Kong, Chris Patten carried out his electoral reform in the British Hong Kong, in the eve of the handover of the sovereignty of the city-state from the British Empire to the People's Republic of China in 1997.

Notable members

 David Akers-Jones
 Chung Sze-yuen
 Charles K. Kao
 Woo Chia-wei

See also

 Hong Kong and Macao Affairs Office

References

Politics of Hong Kong